Liene Vāciete (born 14 June 1991) is a Latvian footballer who plays as a forward for FS Metta. She has been a member of the Latvia women's national team.

References

External links 
 

1991 births
Living people
Latvian women's footballers
Women's association football forwards
Latvia women's youth international footballers
Latvia women's international footballers